The 2020 Arizona Bowl was a college football bowl game played on December 31, 2020, with kickoff at 2:00 p.m. EST (12:00 p.m. local MST). It was the sixth edition of the Arizona Bowl, and was one of the 2020–21 bowl games concluding the 2020 FBS football season. On October 30, it was announced that the game would be played behind closed doors without spectators, due to the COVID-19 pandemic in Arizona. Sponsored by real estate agency Offerpad, the game was officially known as the Offerpad Arizona Bowl.

With the cancellation of the Sun Bowl, on December 10 it was announced that television coverage of the Arizona Bowl would be moved from CBS Sports Network to the CBS broadcast network.

Teams
The game was played between teams from the Mid-American Conference (MAC) and the Mountain West Conference (MWC), in the first year of a five-year tie-in for the two conferences with the Arizona Bowl.

Ball State

Ball State accepted a bid to the Arizona Bowl on December 20, after winning the MAC Championship Game on December 18. The Cardinals entered the contest with a 6–1 record, having won six games in a row after an opening loss to Miami (OH), including a win against Buffalo for the conference championship. Ball State was seeking the first bowl game victory in program history. This contest marked their first appearance in the Arizona Bowl.

San Jose State

San Jose State accepted a bid to the Arizona Bowl following the Spartans' win in the Mountain West Championship Game on December 19. The Spartans entered the bowl with a 7–0 record and ranked No. 19 in the AP Poll, having won each of their six regular season games before defeating Boise State in the conference championship game. The Spartans were looking to complete their first undefeated season since 1939. This was the first Arizona Bowl appearance by the Spartans, and their first game against Ball State.

Game summary

Statistics

References

External links

Game statistics at statbroadcast.com

Arizona Bowl
Arizona Bowl
Arizona Bowl
Arizona Bowl
Ball State Cardinals football bowl games
San Jose State Spartans football bowl games